Irina Sukhova (Ukrainian: Ірина Сухова, born 9 February 1974) is a former tennis player from Ukraine.
Sukhova made her WTA Tour main-draw debut at the Moscow Ladies Open, in the doubles event partnering Tatiana Panova.

ITF Circuit finals

Singles (2–2)

Doubles (4–5)

Junior Grand Slam finals

Girls' doubles

External links
 
 

Ukrainian female tennis players
1974 births
Living people
Soviet female tennis players